Gynaecotyla adunca is a fluke that normally infects birds. It has also been found in 15% of a sample of the marsh rice rat (Oryzomys palustris) from a salt marsh at Cedar Key, Florida. It uses fiddler crabs such as Uca rapax as its intermediate host.

References

Literature cited
Kinsella, J.M. 1988. Comparison of helminths of rice rats, Oryzomys palustris, from freshwater and saltwater marshes in Florida. Proceedings of the Helminthological Society of Washington 55(2):275–280.
Verberg, W.B. and Hunter, W.S. 1961. Studies on oxygen consumption in digenetic trematodes. V. The influence of temperature on three species of adult trematodes (subscription required). Experimental Parasitology 11(1):34–38.

Animals described in 1905
Plagiorchiida
Parasites of birds